The Espy Watts Brawley House, also known as the Brawley House, is a historic home located at Mooresville, Iredell County, North Carolina. It was built in 1904, and is a large -story, transitional Queen Anne / Colonial Revival style frame dwelling. It has a two-story side wing with a two-story, three-sided bay; truncated slate hipped roof; and one-story wraparound porch with porte-cochère.  Also on the property are two contributing outbuildings.

It is currently used as a venue for weddings and other events.  The house's namesake, Espy Watts Brawley, was a prominent local cotton farmer, cottonseed oil manufacturer, and banker.

It was listed on the National Register of Historic Places in 1980.

References

Houses on the National Register of Historic Places in North Carolina
Queen Anne architecture in North Carolina
Colonial Revival architecture in North Carolina
Houses completed in 1904
Houses in Iredell County, North Carolina
National Register of Historic Places in Iredell County, North Carolina